Charles  Canning, 1st Earl Canning,  (14 December 1812 – 17 June 1862), also known as The Viscount Canning and  Clemency Canning, was a British statesman and Governor-General of India during the Indian Rebellion of 1857 and the first Viceroy of India after the transfer of power from the East India Company to the Crown of Queen Victoria in 1858 after the rebellion was crushed.

Canning is credited for ensuring that the administration and most departments of the government functioned normally during the  rebellion and took major administrative decisions even during the peak of the Rebellion in 1857, including establishing the first three modern Universities in India, the University of Calcutta, University of Madras and University of Bombay based on Wood's despatch. Canning passed the Hindu Widows' Remarriage Act, 1856 which was drafted by his predecessor  Lord Dalhousie before the rebellion. He also passed the General Service Enlistment Act of 1856.

After the rebellion he presided over a smooth transfer and reorganisation of government from the East India company to the crown,  the Indian Penal Code was drafted in 1860 based on the code drafted by Macaulay and came into force in 1862. Canning met the rebellion '"with firmness, confidence, magnanimity and calm" as per his biographer. Canning was very firm during the rebellion but after that he focused on reconciliation and reconstruction rather than retribution and issued a clemency proclamation.

Background

Born at Gloucester Lodge, Brompton, near London, Canning was the youngest child of George Canning and Joan, Viscountess Canning, daughter of Major-General John Scott, his father was Prime Minister for a few months in 1827. He was educated at Christ Church, Oxford, where he graduated B.A. in 1833, as first class in classics and second class in mathematics.

Political career

In 1836 he entered Parliament, being returned as member for the town of Warwick in the Conservative interest. He did not, however, sit long in the House of Commons; for, on the death of his mother in 1837, he succeeded to the peerage and entered the House of Lords. His first official appointment was that of Parliamentary Under-Secretary of State for Foreign Affairs, in the administration formed by Sir Robert Peel in 1841, his chief being the Earl of Aberdeen. This post he held till January 1846; and from January to July of that year, when the Peel administration was broken up, Lord Canning filled the post of First Commissioner of Woods and Forests.

He served on the Royal Commission on the British Museum (1847–49). He declined to accept office under the Earl of Derby; but on the formation of the coalition ministry under the Earl of Aberdeen in January 1853, he received the appointment of Postmaster General. In this office, he showed not only a large capacity for hard work but also general administrative ability and much zeal for the improvement of the service. He retained his post under Lord Palmerston's ministry until July 1855, when, in consequence of the departure of Lord Dalhousie and a vacancy in the governor-generalship of India, he was selected by Lord Palmerston to succeed to that great position. This appointment appears to have been made rather on the ground of his father's great services than from any proof as yet given of special personal fitness on the part of Lord Canning. The new governor sailed from England in December 1855 and entered upon the duties of his office in India at the close of February 1856.

According to the Encyclopædia Britannica of 1911, "In the year following his accession to office, the deep-seated discontent of the people broke out in the Indian Rebellion of 1857. Fears were entertained, and even the friends of the Governor-General to some extent shared them, that he was not equal to the crisis. But the fears proved groundless. He had a clear eye for the gravity of the situation, a calm judgment, and a prompt, swift hand to do what was really necessary. ... He carried the Indian empire safely through the stress of the storm, and, what was perhaps a harder task still, he dealt wisely with the enormous difficulties arising at the close of such a war. ... The name of Clemency Canning, which was applied to him during the heated animosities of the moment, has since become a title of honour." He was derisively called "Clemency" on account of a Resolution dated 31 July 1857, which distinguished between sepoys from regiments which had mutinied and killed their officers and European civilians, and those Indian soldiers who had disbanded and dispersed to their villages, without being involved in violence. While subsequently regarded as a humane and sensible measure, the Resolution made Canning unpopular at a time when British popular opinion favoured collective and indiscriminate reprisals.

The Encyclopædia Britannica of 1911 continues, "While rebellion was raging in Oudh he issued a proclamation declaring the lands of the province forfeited, and this step gave rise to much angry controversy. A secret despatch, couched in arrogant and offensive terms, was addressed to Canning by Lord Ellenborough, then a member of the Derby administration, which would have justified the Governor-General in immediately resigning. But from a strong sense of duty, he continued at his post, and ere long the general condemnation of the despatch was so strong that the writer felt it necessary to retire from office. Lord Canning replied to the despatch, calmly and in a statesman-like manner explaining and vindicating his censured policy" and in 1858 he was rewarded by being made the first Viceroy of India.

The Encyclopædia Britannica of 1911 adds, "In April 1859 he received the thanks of both Houses of Parliament for his great services during the rebellion. He was also made an extra civil grand cross of the Order of the Bath, and in May of the same year he was raised to the dignity of an Earl, as Earl Canning. ...By the strain of anxiety and hard work his health and strength were seriously impaired, while the death of his wife was also a great shock to him; in the hope that rest in his native land might restore him, he left India, reaching England in April 1862. But it was too late. He died in London on 17 June. About a month before his death he was created a Knight of the Garter. As he died without issue the titles became extinct."

Prior to the rebellion, Canning and his wife, Charlotte, had desired to produce a photographic survey of Indian people, primarily for their own edification. This project was transformed into an official government study as a consequence of the rebellion, after which it was seen as useful documentation in the effort to learn more about native communities and thereby better understand them. It was eventually published as an eight-volume work, The People of India'', between 1868 and 1875.

Places named after Canning
 Canning Town in London
 Fort Canning Hill, a hill in Singapore, is named after Viscount Charles Canning, although many people mistakenly believe that it is named after his father, George Canning
 Canning Street in Kemptown, Brighton is named after Viscount Canning
Cannington, a neighbourhood in Prayagraj (Allahabad), Uttar Pradesh, India, now known as Civil Lines
 Canning, South 24 Parganas in West Bengal, India
 University of Lucknow, India, was formerly named Canning College

See also
 Charlotte Canning, Countess Canning
 Canning in West Bengal

References

Further reading
 Hinde, Wendy - George Canning (Collins, 1973)

External links
 
 

|-

1812 births
1862 deaths
Members of the Parliament of the United Kingdom for English constituencies
Children of prime ministers of the United Kingdom
Earls in the Peerage of the United Kingdom
Governors-General of India
Knights of the Garter
Knights Grand Cross of the Order of the Bath
Knights Companion of the Order of the Star of India
Members of the Privy Council of the United Kingdom
Viceroys of India
United Kingdom Postmasters General
Alumni of Christ Church, Oxford
UK MPs 1835–1837
UK MPs who inherited peerages
UK MPs who were granted peerages
Founders of Indian schools and colleges
People associated with the British Museum
Burials at Westminster Abbey
Peers of the United Kingdom created by Queen Victoria